Strongylodon macrobotrys, commonly known as jade vine, emerald vine or turquoise jade vine, is a species of leguminous perennial liana (woody vine) endemic to the tropical forests of the Philippines. Its local name is tayabak. A member of the Fabaceae (the pea and bean family), it is closely related to beans such as kidney bean and runner bean. Strongylodon macrobotrys is pollinated by bats.

Origins 
Strongylodon macrobotrys was discovered in 1841 on the jungled slopes of Mount Makiling, on the Philippines’ Luzon Island, by members of the United States Exploring Expedition led by U.S. Navy Lt. Charles Wilkes. One can only imagine how startling that apparition must have been, but we are left only with the description of the Harvard-based botanist Asa Gray, who had locked horns with Wilkes previously and elected not to join the voyage. As part of the task of describing the thousands of plants collected by the multi-ship expedition, which ranged from Honolulu to Antarctica and involved several violent skirmishes with the natives (Wilkes was court-martialed at the end of the expedition, but acquitted), Gray named the vine in 1854.

Its species epithet macrobotrys means “long grape cluster”, from the Greek makros "long" and botrys "bunch of grapes", referring to the fruit; the genus name derives from strongylos "round", and odous  "tooth", referring to the rounded teeth of the calyx.

Description 
It has thick stems up to 2 cm in diameter, which it uses to crawl up tall trees to reach sunlight. Its stems that can reach up to 18 m in length. The vine entwines itself through its host's trunk and branches. 

Its pale green foliage spreads over the canopy and are arranged alternately. Each leaf consists of three oblong leaflets with mucronate tips, the middle leaflet is the largest.

Flowers 

The claw-shaped or beak-shaped flowers are carried in pendent trusses or pseudoracemes of 75 or more flowers and can reach as much as 3 m long. The turquoise flower color is similar to some forms of the minerals turquoise and jade, varying from blue-green to mint green.

The flowers hang like clusters of grapes from inflorescences produced by mature vines. Each individual bloom resembles a stout-bodied butterfly with folded wings; they have evolved certain modifications to allow them to be pollinated by a species of bat that hangs upside down on the inflorescence to drink its nectar.

Their bright coloration has been shown to be an example of copigmentation, a result of the presence of malvin (an anthocyanin) and saponarin (a flavone glucoside) in the ratio 1:9. Under the alkaline conditions (pH 7.9) found in the sap of the epidermal cells, this combination produced a pink pigmentation; the pH of the colorless inner floral tissue was found to be lower, at pH 5.6. Experiments showed that saponarin produced a strong yellow colouring in slightly alkaline conditions, resulting in the greenish tone of the flower.

Fruit 

The short, oblong, fleshy seedpods are up to 15 cm long and contain up to 12 seeds. The jade vine is bat-pollinated in the wild, thus it must be hand-pollinated in greenhouses to bear its fruit, which can grow to be melon-sized. This has been done over the years at the Royal Botanic Gardens at Kew Gardens in England, where seed conservation is an ongoing focus, especially in the face of loss of rainforest habitat.

Habitat and pollinators 
The plant grows beside streams in damp forests, or in ravines.

There are several other species of Strongylodon, but the superficially similar red jade vine, Mucuna bennettii, is a species belonging to a different genus, Mucuna.
It seems to be endemic to the Philippines and is usually found in forests. Propagation has always been difficult. It is considered an endangered species due to the destruction of its habitat and the decrease of its natural pollinators. There seems to be a method of marcotting through mature woody stems. It is best planted in ground near a water source, but not inundated.

Cultivation 
Strongylodon macrobotrys is not frost-tolerant; it needs a minimum temperature of 15 °C (59 °F). It is prized in tropical and subtropical gardens for its showy flowers which are a highly unusual colour, unlike that of almost any other plant. It is usually grown over a pergola or other tall support to display the spectacular cascading flower trusses which are produced generously once the vine is mature (after 2 years or more, depending on pruning regime). Curiously, on a large plant, the pale-coloured blooms can be difficult to see in strong sunlight and could be overlooked if not for the fallen blooms below the vine. Fallen blooms change color as they dry out, from mint green to blue-green to purple. The seed pods are not formed in cultivation, but by mimicking the actions of the natural pollinators, Kew Gardens has been successful in pollinating the flowers and producing seeds. Propagation is also possible from nodal cuttings.

In colder latitudes the plant must be grown in a large glasshouse or conservatory, such as the famous examples grown at Kew Gardens, Cambridge University Botanic Garden, Eden Project and The Living Rainforest in the UK. In cultivation the plant flowers in early spring. In the USA a jade vine can be found at the Naples Botanical Garden, Longwood Gardens, Franklin Park Conservatory, The New York Botanical Garden, Chicago Botanical Garden, Wave Hill, Greater Des Moines Botanical Garden, University of Northern Iowa Botanical Center, White River Gardens, and Nicholas Conservatory and Gardens. In Florida, it is at the Fairchild Tropical Botanic Garden, Marie Selby Botanical Garden, the Gifford Arboretum at the University of Miami, as well as Mounts Botanical Garden. In Hawaii, jade vine specimens can be found at the Hawaii Tropical Botanical Garden in Hilo, Lyon Arboretum in Honolulu, the Garden of Eden Arboretum in Haiku, the Wahiawa Botanical Garden in Central Oahu and Glenn’s Flowers and Plants in Waimanalo.

Uses
Jade vine flowers are edible and are eaten as vegetables in the Philippines in a similar manner as Sesbania grandiflora (the vegetable hummingbird or katurai).

Pests and diseases
Although well known in other Fabaceae—including obviously soybeans—the Soybean mosaic virus has only recently been found in S. macrobotrys in Brazil (University of São Paulo, Piracicaba, São Paulo state). Whether S. macrobotrys is commonly infected, and whether it serves as a virus reservoir for nearby soybean fields, will need to be investigated.

Gallery

References

External links

 Strongylodon macrobotrys A. Gray - inflorescence, stamen, pistil, ovary  Images - Flavon's Wild herb and Alpine plants

Phaseoleae
Vines
Endemic flora of the Philippines
Garden plants of Asia
Articles containing video clips
Taxa named by Asa Gray
Plants described in 1854
Fabales of Asia